The 2010 season for , its last, began in January with the Tour Down Under and ended in October at the Giro di Lombardia. As a UCI ProTour team, they were automatically invited and obliged to attend every event in the ProTour. The team's ridership was largely unchanged from the 2009 season.

2010 roster 
Ages as of 1 January 2010.

Riders who joined the team for the 2010 season

Riders who left the team during or after the 2009 season

One-day races

Spring classics

Fall races

Stage races
Rohregger won the mountains classification at the first ProTour event of the season, the Tour Down Under.

Grand Tours

Giro d'Italia
Gerdemann was the leader of Team Milram's squad at the Giro d'Italia, in his first participation in the event. Förster, a three-time Giro stage winner, was brought along with the sprints in mind. In stage 3 in the Netherlands, Förster, Gerdemann, and Rohregger all avoided the many crashes that took place on the day and finished with the leading group, taking third, seventh, and ninth respectively in the sprint. Gerdemann was in eighth overall, 12 seconds back, before the transfer to Italy. In the stage 4 team time trial, the squad was tenth, finishing with five riders 57 seconds off the pace of stage winners . In stage 6, Gerdemann finished the stage with the peloton and moved into eighth overall, leapfrogging in the overall standings over several sprinters who were left minutes behind. Gerdemann and Rohregger finished together, for 12th and 13th at one minute and 13 seconds back, in the difficult and muddy stage 7 in Tuscany. With this result, both were in the top ten for a day, though both were dropped on Monte Terminillo the next day and fell out of the top ten. Förster took fourth and then fifth in the sprint finishes to stages 9 and 10.

In stage 11, more than 50 riders formed the day's breakaway, with the Giro's favorites conceding nearly 13 minutes to the stage winner. Gerdemann and Russ made the selection, and with sixth on the stage Gerdemann moved into seventh overall. In the first of the Giro's several mountain stages in its last week, Gerdemann rode the Monte Grappa climb with the second group on the road, losing 2'25" to stage winner Vincenzo Nibali but moving up to fifth in the overall classification. Gerdemann conceded time in each climbing stage the rest of the way, and the squad did not have any high stage placings from stage 14 on. Gerdemann completed the race in 16th place, at a deficit of 34'49 to Giro champion Ivan Basso. The squad finished 19th in the Trofeo Fast Team standings and 14th in the Trofeo Super Team.

Tour de France
Gerdemann also led Milram's squad for the Tour de France, with Ciolek their primary sprinter. Gerdemann showed well in the prologue time trial, coming in tenth, 35 seconds off the winning time of Fabian Cancellara. Over the next two days, the team took numerous meaningless high placings, as both of the first two road race stages involved neutralizations following crashes. The squad was largely unaffected by the myriad of crashes that took place on the Col du Stockeu in Spa in stage 2, though Terpstra did crash at one point. In a more straightforward flat stage in stage 5, Ciolek took second behind Mark Cavendish in the field sprint finish. He was sixth the next day in a similar finish. Roberts made a winning breakaway in stage 15, but was left well short of victory on the day, finishing with Alberto Contador's group three minutes behind stage winner Thomas Voeckler, as the new race leader caught the last remnants of that group right at the finish. In the Tour's largely ceremonial final stage, Ciolek again figured into the sprint finish, taking sixth on the day. No member of the squad was ever competitive in the overall standings. Rohregger was their highest-placed rider at the race's conclusion, in 74th place, 2 hours and 12 minutes behind Tour champion Contador. Gerdemann was 84th, a further 24 minutes back. The squad finished in last place in the teams classification.

Vuelta a España

Team dissolution

Riders' 2011 teams

Season victories

Notes

References

2010 road cycling season by team